Andy Harrow (born 6 November 1956) is a Scottish former football player.

Playing career

Andy Harrow was born in Kirkcaldy in 1956. He began his career with Cowdenbeath, signing from Junior club Greig Park Rangers in 1973. After four seasons at Cowdenbeath, he joined home town club Raith Rovers. After leaving Raith, he had a short spell with English club Luton Town, before Alex Ferguson signed him for Aberdeen in 1980. First team opportunities were limited for Harrow at Aberdeen, so he left Pittodrie to join Motherwell in 1982. After four years at Fir Park, he returned to Raith Rovers for two years, and ended his career in 1990 at East Fife.

Personal life

After retiring from playing, he became reserve team coach at Raith Rovers. He also served as manager of Cowdenbeath from 1992 to 1993. More recently, he has set up a welder fabricator business in Kirkcaldy.

References

1956 births
Living people
Footballers from Kirkcaldy
Scottish footballers
Aberdeen F.C. players
Cowdenbeath F.C. players
Raith Rovers F.C. players
Luton Town F.C. players
Motherwell F.C. players
East Fife F.C. players
Scottish Football League players
English Football League players
Scottish football managers
Cowdenbeath F.C. managers
Scottish Football League managers
Association football forwards